Samuel Ayomide Adekugbe (born January 16, 1995) is a professional footballer who plays as a left-back for Süper Lig club Galatasaray, on loan from Hatayspor, and the Canada national team. Born in England, he obtained Canadian citizenship in 2016.

Club career

Vancouver Whitecaps FC
On August 28, 2013, Adekugbe signed a Generation Adidas homegrown contract with MLS club Vancouver Whitecaps FC, making him the seventh homegrown signing in club history. He made his professional debut on October 27 in the final game of the 2013 season which ended in a 3–0 victory over Colorado Rapids.

Loan to Brighton & Hove Albion
During Winter 2015, Adekugbe was invited to train at English Football League Championship club Brighton & Hove Albion. On July 15, 2016, Adekugbe transferred to Brighton on a season-long loan deal agreement, initially linking up with the club's development squad. On August 9, 2016, Adekugbe started in the 4–0 victory over Colchester United in the 2016–17 EFL Cup. On August 23, 2016, Adekugbe scored his first professional goal in a 4–2 victory over Oxford United in the second round of the 2016–17 EFL Cup.

On January 14, 2017, Adekugbe started his first Championship game in a 2–0 defeat against Preston North End.

Loan to IFK Göteborg
Adekugbe joined Allsvenskan club IFK Göteborg on loan on July 25, 2017, for the remainder of the season, with an option to buy for the club. He made his debut against IFK Norrköping in a 4–1 win on July 30.

Vålerenga
On January 8, 2018, Eliteserien club Vålerenga announced they had signed Adekugbe to a four-year deal. He made his debut against Kristiansund on March 12, 2018 In 3.5 seasons with the Oslo club, Adekugbe would play 94 games.

Hatayspor 
On June 18, 2021, it was announced Adekugbe had signed a three-year deal with Turkish Süper Lig side Hatayspor, effective August 1, 2021. He made his debut on August 14 against Kasımpaşa.

Loan to Galatasaray 
On 17 February 2023, he signed a loan contract with Galatasaray until the end of the 2022–23 season.

International career
Adekugbe was eligible to represent England, Nigeria or Canada internationally. In 2012, he was quoted saying he dreamed of playing for England at Wembley. However, he has represented Canada at youth and senior level.

Youth
Adekugbe was part of Canada's U-18 squad for the 2013 COTIF U-20 tournament from August 11 to 21. After a successful 2014 campaign with Vancouver, Adekugbe was called up to the U20 squad by coach Rob Gale on November 7, 2014. He made his debut for the side against England on November 12 in a 1–1 draw. In January 2015 he would participate with Canada in the 2015 CONCACAF U-20 Championship.

Senior
Adekugbe received his first call up to the Canada senior team for two friendlies against Mauritania in September  2013, though he did not feature in either match.  He made his debut two years later in a against Belize on September 8, 2015. In June 2017 Adekugbe was named to Canada's squad for that year's CONCACAF Gold Cup.

On November 16, 2021, during Canada's 2022 FIFA World Cup qualifier against Mexico at Edmonton's Commonwealth Stadium, Adekugbe celebrated Cyle Larin's 52nd-minute goal by diving backward into a pitchside snow bank. The celebration subsequently went viral. He scored his first goal for Canada in a 2022 FIFA World Cup qualifier against the United States on January 30, 2022. In November 2022, Adekugbe was named to the 2022 FIFA World Cup team for Canada.

Personal life
Adekugbe was born in London to parents with Nigerian heritage and lived in England until 10, when his family moved to Calgary, Alberta in Western Canada. His younger brother Elijah is also a professional soccer player. He is a fan of Manchester City.

Adekugbe received his Canadian permanent residency status on August 23, 2013, which qualifies him as a domestic player on Canadian clubs for MLS roster purposes. He became a Canadian citizen in 2016.

Career statistics

Club

International

Scores and results list Canada's goal tally first, score column indicates score after each Adekugbe goal.

References

External links
 
 Whitecaps FC bio
 
 

1995 births
Living people
Canadian soccer players
Canadian expatriate soccer players
Canada men's youth international soccer players
Canada men's international soccer players
English footballers
Vancouver Whitecaps FC U-23 players
Vancouver Whitecaps FC players
Whitecaps FC 2 players
Brighton & Hove Albion F.C. players
IFK Göteborg players
Vålerenga Fotball players
Hatayspor footballers
Galatasaray S.K. footballers
Soccer people from Alberta
USL League Two players
Major League Soccer players
USL Championship players
Norwegian Second Division players
English Football League players
English expatriates in Canada
Canadian sportspeople of Nigerian descent
English people of Nigerian descent
2015 CONCACAF U-20 Championship players
British emigrants to Canada
Footballers from Greater London
2017 CONCACAF Gold Cup players
2022 FIFA World Cup players
Association football defenders
Canadian expatriate sportspeople in England
English expatriate sportspeople in Canada
Expatriate soccer players in Canada
English expatriate footballers
Allsvenskan players
Eliteserien players
Homegrown Players (MLS)
Calgary Foothills FC players
Expatriate footballers in Sweden
Canadian expatriate sportspeople in Sweden
Expatriate footballers in Norway
Canadian expatriate sportspeople in Norway
Expatriate footballers in Turkey
Canadian expatriate sportspeople in Turkey
Black British sportsmen